In Greek mythology, Homados (Ancient Greek: Όμαδος)  was the personification of battle-noise—the shouts and cries of men and the clashing of weapons. He was probably numbered amongst the Makhai, the daimones of the battlefield.

Mythology 
In the epic poem the Shield of Heracles, attributed to Hesiod, Homados was one of the many figures, depicted on Heracles' shield.In his hands he (Herakles) took his shield, all glittering : no one ever broke it with a blow or crushed it. And a wonder it was to see . . . In the centre was Phobos (Fear) worked in adamant, unspeakable, staring backwards with eyes that glowed with fire. His mouth was full of teeth in a white row, fearful and daunting, and upon his grim brow hovered frightful Eris (Battle-Strife) who arrays the throng of men: pitiless she, for she took away the mind and senses of poor wretches who made war against the son of Zeus . . . Upon the shield Proioxis (Pursuit) and Palioxis (Flight) were wrought, and Homados (Tumult), and Phobos (Panic), and Androktasia (Slaughter). Eris (Battle-Strife) also, and Kydoimos (Confusion) were hurrying about, and deadly Ker (Fate) was there holding one man newly wounded. . .

See also

 Alala
 Alke
 Ioke
 Polemus

Notes

References 

 Hesiod, Shield of Heracles from The Homeric Hymns and Homerica with an English Translation by Hugh G. Evelyn-White, Cambridge, MA.,Harvard University Press; London, William Heinemann Ltd. 1914. Online version at the Perseus Digital Library. Greek text available from the same website.

Greek war deities
War gods
Greek gods
Personifications in Greek mythology
Daimons